The Western Division of Fiji is one of Fiji's four divisions.  It consists of three provinces in western/northern Viti Levu, namely Ba, Nadroga-Navosa and Ra. The largest city is Lautoka.

It also includes a few outlying islands, including the Yasawa Islands, Viwa Island, and Mamanuca Islands.  It has a land border with the Central Division on Viti Levu, and sea borders with the Northern Division and Eastern Division.

References

Western